, also written 2010 VR11, is a Kuiper belt object with an absolute magnitude of 5.6. Astronomer Mike Brown lists it as possibly a dwarf planet.

References

External links 
 

Minor planet object articles (unnumbered)

20101102